Lancaster bus station serves the city of Lancaster, Lancashire, England. The bus station was funded by both the Lancashire County Council and Lancaster City Council. The station, situated in the centre of the city, was re-built and opened in 2001, is staffed full-time, completely covered and consists of 20 stands, a travel centre, a refreshment kiosk, on site toilet facilities and an electronic passenger information board. Directly outside the bus station is Lancaster's main taxi rank.

Services
The main operators from the bus station are Stagecoach Cumbria & North Lancashire operating under the name Stagecoach in Lancaster with the remainder of the local services being run by local firms Travellers Choice, Kirkby Lonsdale Coaches and Battersby's Silver Grey. Buses mainly travel from the bus station around the Lancaster, Morecambe, Heysham and Carnforth areas, but  regular services also  run as far afield as Preston, Blackpool and Knott End on Sea in Lancashire. Skipton, Hawes, Settle, Bentham and Ingleton in North Yorkshire and Kirkby Lonsdale, Kendal, Keswick and the central Lake District in Cumbria (route 555). There is also a single seasonal Sunday and Bank Holiday service that runs directly to Clitheroe. Preston Bus also run a seasonal return Sunday and Bank Holiday service to Richmond and Leyburn in North Yorkshire that calls at both Lancaster bus station and Lancaster University. 

Pre booked excursion and long distance coaches also arrive and depart from Lancaster bus station with National Express running direct services to Manchester, Leeds, Sheffield, Birmingham, Leicester, Milton Keynes, London, Exeter, Plymouth, Glasgow, Dundee, Aberdeen, and Edinburgh.

Railway station
Lancaster railway station, which is approximately half a mile from the bus station and is on the West Coast Main Line, has a regular number 11 service from the bus station. From the railway station, there are direct services to London, Birmingham, Wolverhampton, Manchester, Coventry, Carlisle, Barrow-in-Furness, Windermere, Glasgow, Edinburgh, Leeds and Liverpool.

External links
 Lancaster bus and rail information  - Lancaster City Council
 Stagecoach Cumbria & North Lancashire
 National Express Destinations
 Megabus website

Bus stations in Lancashire
Buildings and structures in Lancaster, Lancashire
Transport in the City of Lancaster